was a Porpoise-class submarine, the fifth ship of the United States Navy to be named for the shark. Her keel was laid down by the Electric Boat Company in Groton, Connecticut, on 24 October 1933. She was launched on 21 May 1935 (sponsored by Miss Ruth Ellen Lonergan, 12-year-old daughter of United States Senator Augustine Lonergan of Connecticut), and commissioned on 25 January 1936.

Inter-war period

Asiatic Fleet
Following shakedown in the North Atlantic and the Caribbean Sea, Shark transited the Panama Canal and arrived at San Diego, California on 4 March 1937. She spent the next year and one-half in training exercises and Army-Navy war problems as a unit of Submarine Squadron 6 (SubRon 6). Following a regular overhaul at Mare Island Navy Yard, Vallejo, California, Shark got underway from San Diego on 16 December 1938 bound for Pearl Harbor and reassignment to SubRon 4.

Following two years of operations in the Hawaii area, Shark set sail from Pearl Harbor on 3 December 1940 to join the Asiatic Fleet based at Manila, where she engaged in fleet tactics and exercises until the Japanese attack on Pearl Harbor. Departing Manila on 9 December 1941, she was at sea during the Japanese bombing raids on Manila the next day. For the next week, Shark patrolled Tayabas Bay until ordered back to Manila on 19 December to embark Admiral Thomas C. Hart, Commander-in-Chief, Asiatic Fleet, for transportation to Soerabaja, Java.

World War II
On 6 January 1942, Shark was almost hit with a torpedo from an Imperial Japanese Navy submarine. A few days later, she was ordered to Ambon Island, where an enemy invasion was expected. On 27 January, she was directed to join the submarines patrolling in [[Molucca Passage]], then to cover the passage east of Lifamatola and Bangka Strait. Five days later, she reported chasing an empty cargo ship headed northwest, for which the Asiatic Fleet Submarine Commander, Captain John E. Wilkes, upbraided Shane. No further messages were received from Shark. On 8 February, she was told to proceed to Makassar Strait and later was told to report information. Nothing was heard and, on 7 March, Shark was reported as presumed lost, the victim of unknown causes, the first American submarine lost to enemy anti-submarine warfare. She was struck from the Naval Vessel Register on 24 June.

Post-war, Japanese records showed numerous attacks on unidentified submarines in Sharks area at plausible times. At 01:37 on 11 February, for example, the Japanese destroyer  opened fire with her  guns and sank a surfaced submarine. Voices were heard in the water, but no attempt was made to rescue possible survivors.

Awards
 Asiatic-Pacific Campaign Medal with one battle star for World War II service

References

External links 
On Eternal Patrol: USS Shark

United States Porpoise-class submarines
World War II submarines of the United States
Lost submarines of the United States
Ships built in Groton, Connecticut
1935 ships
Maritime incidents in February 1942
Shipwrecks of Indonesia
Ships lost with all hands
Submarines sunk by Japanese warships